Fazal Hakim (:born 4 April 1974) is a Pakistani politician hailing from Swat District, who had been a member of the Provincial Assembly of Khyber Pakhtunkhwa from August 2018 till January 2023. He also served as member of the 10th Provincial Assembly of Khyber Pakhtunkhwa, belonging to the Pakistan Tehreek-e-Insaf. He also served as member of the different committees.

Political career
Fazal Hakim was elected as the member of the Khyber Pakhtunkhwa Assembly on ticket of Pakistan Tehreek-e-Insaf from PK-80 (Swat-I) in 2013 Pakistani general election.

References

Living people
Pashtun people
Khyber Pakhtunkhwa MPAs 2013–2018
People from Swat District
Pakistan Tehreek-e-Insaf MPAs (Khyber Pakhtunkhwa)
1974 births